Anne One Hundred is a 1933 British drama film directed by Henry Edwards and starring Betty Stockfeld, Gyles Isham and Dennis Wyndham. It was based on the play Anne One Hundred Percent by Sewell Collins. It was made at British and Dominion's Elstree Studios as a quota quickie.

Premise
A young woman inherits a soap factory from her father, and struggles to keep it open.

Cast
 Betty Stockfeld as Anne Briston
 Gyles Isham as Nixon
 Dennis Wyndham as March
 Evelyn Roberts as Burton Fraim
 Allan Jeayes as Penvale
 Eric Hales as Masters
 Quentin McPhearson as Mole
 Phyllis Calvert

References

Bibliography
 Chibnall, Steve. Quota Quickies: The Birth of the British 'B' Film. British Film Institute, 2007.

External links
 

1933 films
1933 drama films
Films directed by Henry Edwards
British drama films
Quota quickies
British black-and-white films
British and Dominions Studios films
Films shot at Imperial Studios, Elstree
1930s English-language films
1930s British films